Ornipholidotos aureliae is a butterfly in the family Lycaenidae. It is found in the north-eastern part of the Democratic Republic of the Congo. The habitat consists of forests.

References

Butterflies described in 2005
Taxa named by Michel Libert
Ornipholidotos
Endemic fauna of the Democratic Republic of the Congo
Butterflies of Africa